Laputa is a 1986 West German drama film directed by Helma Sanders-Brahms. It was screened in the Un Certain Regard section at the 1986 Cannes Film Festival.

Cast
 Sami Frey as Paul
 Krystyna Janda as Malgorzata

References

External links

1986 films
1986 drama films
1980s avant-garde and experimental films
German drama films
German avant-garde and experimental films
West German films
1980s German-language films
Adultery in films
Films directed by Helma Sanders-Brahms
Films set in Berlin
1980s German films